Fred Carter (June 22, 1938 – May 9, 2022) was an American comic book artist known for the work he did on Jack Chick's tracts which promote Protestant fundamentalism.

Early life and education

Carter studied at the American Academy of Art in Chicago.

Work

Carter used richly detailed shading in his art. He worked anonymously for Chick Publications from 1972 until 1980 when Chick acknowledged Carter's work in an issue of his newsletter Battle Cry. The two collaborated on Chick's 2001 film The Light of the World, presenting Bible stories through oil paintings by Carter.

References

External links

Carter bio at Christian Comics International

1938 births
2022 deaths
American artists
African-American Christians
African-American comics creators
American comics creators
21st-century African-American people
20th-century African-American people
Christian comics creators